Martin (17/19 December 1406 – August 1407) was heir apparent to the throne of Sicily. He was a member of the House of Barcelona.

Life
He was the son and heir apparent of Martin I, King of Sicily. His mother was Blanche, who became Queen of Navarre in 1425. His parents got married on 26 November 1402. Queen Blanche's first pregnancy had ended in miscarriage. Nevertheless, the young queen's second pregnancy was successful, and he was born on 17 or 19 December 1406 in Sicily. He was baptized Martin after his father and grandfather, King Martin of Aragon, who informed the maternal grandfather, King Charles III of Navarre, of the birth.

Martin's grandaunt Violant of Bar, queen dowager of Aragon, proposed an engagement to her brother-in-law, King Martin the Elder, between their grandchildren, the new-born Martin and her granddaughter, Marie of Anjou. in order to see her offspring on the Aragonese throne.

The little prince, however, died few months later on August 1407 in Sicily. Not only the dowager queen's hopes failed but the continuity of the House of Barcelona was at risk. Few years later the royal branch of the House of Barcelona became extinct in legitimate male line.

Notes

Bibliography
Lo Forte Scirpo, Maria Rita: C'era una volta una regina... : due donne per un regno: Maria d'Aragona e Bianca di Navarra, Napoli, Liguori, 2003. 
 Fodale, Salvatore: Blanca de Navarra y el gobierno de Sicilia, Príncipe de Viana 60, 311–322, 1999. URL: See External links
 Silleras-Fernández, Núria: Spirit and Force: Politics, Public and Private in the Reign of Maria de Luna (1396–1406), In: Theresa Earenfight (ed.): Queenship and Political Power in Medieval and Early Modern Spain, Ashgate, 78–90, 2005. , 9780754650744 URL: See External links
 Miron, E. L.: The Queens of Aragon: Their Lives and Times, London, Stanley Paul & Co, 1913. URL: See External links
 Tramontana, Salvatore: Il matrimonio con Martino: il progetto, i capitoli, la festa, Príncipe de Viana 60, 13–24, 1999. URL: See External links
Silleras-Fernández, Núria: Widowhood and Deception: Ambiguities of Queenship in Late Medieval Crown of Aragon, In: Mark Crane et al. (eds.): Shell Games: Studies in Scams, Frauds and Deceits (1300–1650), CRRS Publications, Toronto, 2004, 185–207. URL: See External links

External links
 – 12 August 2011
 – 12 August 2011
Núria Silleras-Fernández: Widowhood and Deception: Ambiguities of Queenship in Late Medieval Crown of Aragon – 12 August 2011
 Núria Silleras-Fernández: Spirit and Force: Politics, Public and Private in the Reign of Maria de Luna (1396–1406) – 12 August 2011
 Miron: The Queens of Aragon – 12 August 2011
 Libro d'Oro della Nobilità Mediterranea/Bellonidi (Aragonesi) – 12 August 2011
 Salvatore Fodale: Blanca de Navarra y el gobierno de Sicilia – 12 August 2011
 Salvatore Tramontana: Il matrimonio con Martino: il progetto, i capitoli, la festa – 12 August 2011

1406 births
1407 deaths
House of Aragon
Aragonese infantes
Heirs apparent who never acceded
Royalty and nobility who died as children
Sons of kings